Audun Dybdahl (born 10 September 1944, died 22 June 2021) was a Norwegian historian of the Middle Ages. He was professor of history at the Norwegian University of Science and Technology (NTNU).

Career and work

Audun Dybdahl studied at the universities of Oslo and Trondheim, and earned his cand.philol. degree in 1968 and his dr.philos. degree in 1980 with a dissertation on mediaeval estate owners in Trøndelag. He was a specialist on Norwegian mediaeval history, and his major works included Fosens historie, Trøndelags historie and Klima, uår og kriser i Norge gjennom de siste 1000 år, a monograph on changing climate and crises over the past millennium.

Honours
He was elected as a member of the Royal Norwegian Society of Sciences and Letters. He received the Article of the Year – Scandinavian University Press Academic Journal Prize in 2010.

References

1944 births
2021 deaths
Norwegian historians
Academic staff of the Norwegian University of Science and Technology
Royal Norwegian Society of Sciences and Letters